In mathematics, the Vogel plane is a method of parameterizing simple Lie algebras by eigenvalues α, β, γ of the Casimir operator on the symmetric square of the Lie algebra, which gives a point (α: β: γ) of P2/S3, the projective plane P2 divided out by the symmetric group S3 of permutations of coordinates.

The point of the projective plane (modulo permutations)  corresponding to a simple complex Lie algebra is given by  three eigenvalues α, β, γ of the Casimir operator acting on  spaces A, B, C, where the symmetric square of the Lie algebra (usually) decomposes as a sum of the complex numbers and 3 irreducible spaces A, B, C.

See also

E7½

References

Lie groups
Lie algebras